Caussade is a French surname. Notable people with the surname include:

Alain Caussade (born 1952), French rugby union player
Georges Caussade (1873–1936), French classical composer, music theorist and educator
Gilles Caussade (born 1947), French film producer
Jean Pierre de Caussade (1675–1751), French Jesuit priest and writer

See also
Simone Plé-Caussade (1897–1986), French classical musician, composer and music educator

French-language surnames